Valiant was a British boys' adventure comics anthology which ran from 1962 to 1976. It was published by IPC Magazines and was one of that company's major adventure titles throughout the 1960s and early 1970s.

Publication history
The title went through a number of name changes and mergers, although always returning to its simpler one-word name. 

On 23 February 1963, it merged with Knockout to become Valiant and Knockout. With the issue from February 1964, the title dropped "Knockout" and reverted to simply Valiant.

In June of 1963, Fleetway (IPC) brought out the first two (per month) issues of the digest-sized spinoff Valiant Picture Library which featured stories that had nothing to do with the main title. Valiant Picture Library cost one shilling. It ultimately ran 144 monthly issues from 1963 to 1969.

With issue #137 (15 May 1965), the title went from 28 to 40 pages for one penny more (to seven pence). 

Valiant merged with Smash! in April 1971, becoming Valiant and Smash. It was briefly published for one week as Valiant again on 25 September, but then absorbed the former City Magazines title TV21 on 2 October to become Valiant and TV21. It merged with Lion on 25 May 1974 to temporarily become Valiant and Lion.

After many years, Valiant began to seem old-fashioned, when in 1975 the first example of a new type of comic was launched by IPC: Battle Picture Weekly. Valiant suffered further when IPC editor Pat Mills launched Action in February 1976. In 1975, John Wagner had been installed as editor to update the title; his attempts were initially successful but Valiant struggled to find a place in the market against these more "mature" adventure titles. Valiant limped on for a few months, merging with Vulcan on 10 April 1976, but finally merged with Battle Picture Weekly on 23 October, signaling the end of Valiant.

Stories
The stories in Valiant were mainly two or three pages long, and in black and white (apart from the coloured covers). Many of them were story arcs, which continued week after week, with cliff-hanger endings so readers had to buy the next issue to see how the various characters escaped from dangerous or deadly situations.

Valiant contained a mix of conventional war stories, such as Captain Hurricane from the first issue, which was a semi-humorous strip set during the Second World War about a massive ex-sea skipper who became a Captain in the Royal Marines, and who could be provoked into "ragin' fury" berserker rages which gave him great strength; classic humour strips, such as The Crows who were in almost all issues from the first issue, and The Nutts (Ginger Nutt, the teenage daughter, only really had one panel in issue 3; she was too good-looking to be a figure of fun), also from the first issue, and Billy Bunter from issue 21; as well as classic detective strips, such as Sexton Blake.

It also had a number of innovative new heroes. In Kelly's Eye from issue 21, for instance, Tim Kelly wore a jewel called the Eye of Zoltec (obtained from a Mayan idol) around his neck, which protected him from all harm, making him invulnerable. Adam Eterno (who originally appeared in Thunder) was thousands of years old, and could only be slain by a fatal blow from a weapon made of gold. The House of Dolmann, which started with issue #210 (8 October 1966), featured an inventor and ventriloquist who constructed remote-controlled "dolls", or puppets, with strange abilities, such as stretching, drilling, and vision powers, that helped him in his fight against crime. Jack O'Justice from the first issue, always accompanied by his girlfriend and eventual wife Moll Moonlight, was a swashbuckling 18th-century adventurer who fought criminals, the supernatural and monsters; both Jack and Moll were experts with their swords and on horseback. In time, the Jack O'Justice stories ended; in issue #195 (1966) the series was replaced by Jack Justice, a contemporary crimefighting adventurer 200 years later, who was the direct descendant of Jack and Moll.

The celebrated anti-hero The Steel Claw, from the first issue, with his fantastic power of invisibility and the capability to electrocute his enemies, due to his body's ability to store electric current, would influence comic creators such as Alan Moore and David Lloyd. 

Mytek the Mighty, a giant robot ape from issue #104, started out as a villain in the hands of a criminal named Gogra, but eventually became a hero who battled other robots and giant creatures. The same issue featured Legge's Eleven, about a crazy team of footballers. Both Mytek and Legge's Eleven ended in issue number #282 (24 February 1968) but Mytek was back in issue #297 (8 June 1968).

Tom Tully and Mike Western's The Wild Wonders debuted in 1968, about a pair of wild boys, brought up by animals, who turn out to be fantastic athletes, for which Western used a semi-cartoony style which was much imitated. The strip ran until 1973.

Issue #137 introduced an ongoing two-to-three-page text story titled Jason Hyde about a mystery man from whose eyes poured blue rays (he normally wore special sunglasses) that allowed him to see through solid objects and read minds. He had many strange adventures: including deep inside the Earth; in another dimension; fighting giant spiders; and fighting a man with incredible superpowers. His last story was in #293 (11 May 1968). Also Fort Navajo with Mike Blueberry, from the Franco-Belgian comics.

A number of strips inherited from Smash! moved to Valiant in April 1971, including the adventure serials The Incredible Adventures of Janus Stark and The Thirteen Tasks of Simon Test, and the humour strips The Swots and the Blots and His Sporting Lordship. Of these, the longest-running was Janus Stark, about a Victorian escapologist and private detective, written by Angus Allan with art by the studio of Solano López; the strip lasted in Valiant until 22 March 1975.

Two new strips introduced by John Wagner in 1975 were Death Wish, a World War Two story, and One-Eyed Jack, about a New York detective. Another late-appearing strip was The Prisoner of Zenga, about a powerful robot with the brain of an arch-criminal named Max Zenga.

Character re-appearances and legacy 
Several of Valiant's characters have made appearances since the comic's cancellation. Alan Moore and Alan Davis used several (renamed) characters in their Captain Britain strip. Also, Quality Comics released a four-issue mini-series of The Steel Claw in 1986, featuring recoloured reprint material, with new material drawn by Garry Leach that acted as a framing device. The Steel Claw and several of IPC's 1960s heroes were also featured in Zenith in 2000 AD, followed by a one-off special featuring old Valiant and IPC characters, the 2000 AD Action Special in 1992.

In 2005–2006, many Valiant characters were featured in a limited series called Albion, published by the Wildstorm imprint of DC Comics, plotted by Alan Moore and written by Leah Moore & John Reppion; these included Danny Doom, Eric Dolmann, Janus Stark, Jason Hyde, Mytek the Mighty and Gogra, and The Steel Claw.

In March 2012, Royal Mail launched a special stamp collection to celebrate Britain's rich comic book history. The collection featured Valiant, along with The Beano, The Dandy, Eagle, The Topper, Roy of the Rovers, Bunty, Buster, Twinkle and 2000 AD.

Notes

References

Further reading
Valiant at 26pigs.com, a site for British comics
 "Adventure Time" by Stephen Jewell, in Judge Dredd Megazine no. 432 (June 2021), pp. 40–43

Comics magazines published in the United Kingdom
1962 comics debuts
Defunct British comics
Magazines established in 1962
Magazines disestablished in 1976
Adventure comics
Magazines about comics
Defunct magazines published in the United Kingdom
Publications of Sexton Blake